The Saône is a major French river.

Other possible uses include:

 Citadel of Salah Ed-Din, a Syrian castle sometimes known as "Saone"
 French ship Saône, a French ship
 Lakota people, which include people sometimes referred to as "Saone"
 Saône, Doubs, a city in France